Uranothyris is a genus of moths in the family Sesiidae.

Species
Uranothyris pterotarsa Meyrick, 1933

References

Sesiidae